Butterfly skate can refer to any of three species of skate:
 Bathyraja papilionifera, a species of skate found in the Southwest Atlantic.
 Leucoraja naevus, a species of skate, also known as the Cuckoo ray, found in the Eastern Atlantic.
 Bathyraja mariposa, a species of skate found off the coast of Alaska, especially the Aleutian Islands.

References